Hij may refer to:
 Hijuk language, a Bantu language of Cameroon
 Hiroshima Airport, in Japan (IATA code)